Karatepe (Turkish, 'Black Hill'; Hittite: Azatiwataya) is a late Hittite fortress and open-air museum in Osmaniye Province in southern Turkey lying at a distance of about 23 km from the district center of Kadirli. It is sited in the Taurus Mountains, on the right bank of the Ceyhan River. The site is contained within Karatepe-Aslantaş National Park.

History
The place was an ancient city of Cilicia, which controlled a passage from eastern Anatolia to the north Syrian plain. It became an important Neo-Hittite center after the collapse of the Hittite Empire in the late 12th century BC. Relics found here include vast historic tablets, statues and ruins, even two monumental gates with reliefs on the sills depicting hunting and warring and a boat with oars; pillars of lions and sphinxes flank the gates.

Karatepe inscription

The site's eighth-century BC bilingual inscription, in Phoenician and Hieroglyphic Luwian, reflects the activities of the kings of Adana from the "house of Mopsos", given in Hieroglyphic Luwian as mu-ka-sa- (often rendered as 'Moxos') and in Phoenician as Mopsos in the form mpš. It was composed in Phoenician and then translated to Hieroglyphic Luwian. This inscription has served archaeologists as a Rosetta stone for deciphering those glyphs.

As we learn from the inscription, its author is Azatiwada (or Azatiwata), the ruler of the town. He was also its founder; the inscription commemorates the town's foundation. He acknowledged himself as a subordinate of Awariku, the king of Adanawa (Adana), which was the ancient kingdom of Quwe. Azatiwataya seems to have been one of the frontier towns of Adanawa.

Another inscription of the same type, the Cinekoy inscription, was discovered more recently. It also mentions king Awariku, who may have been the same ruler, or part of the same dynasty.

Troy theory
According to writer and translator Raoul Schrott, the fortress and surrounding landscape at Karatepe significantly match Homer's descriptions of Troy in the Iliad. According to this theory, Homer may have used his knowledge of the legend of Troy and combined it into historical fiction, using his own experiences and access to writings as a scribe in the service of the Assyrians in Karatepe.

Archaeology

The site was examined during the Oriental Institute of Chicago archaeological survey of the Amuq Valley in 1936. Karatepe was excavated from 1947 to 1957 by a team led by Helmuth Theodor Bossert (1889–1961), revealing the ruins of the walled city of king Azatiwataš.
 Restoration work was then carried on for many years, which included some further soundings. In the late 1990s, archaeological work, now led by Halet Çambel (1916–2014), was conducted on a palace at the site.

Estimates for the dating of Azatiwataš rule have ranged from the early 8th century BC to the early 7th century BC.

The artifacts are exhibited today in the Karatepe-Aslantaş Open-Air Museum, which is part of the Karatepe-Aslantaş National Park.

Namesake
In the 2004 exploration of Mars, "Karatepe" was the name given to a site designated for entering the Endurance crater to investigate the layering of the bedrock.

See also

Quwê
Cities of the ancient Near East
Short chronology timeline

References

Further reading
Halet Cambel, Corpus of Hieroglyphic Luwian Inscriptions, Vol. 2: Karatepe-Aslantas (Undersuchungen Zur Indogermanischen Sprachund Kulturwissenschaft, Vol 6), Walter de Gruyter, 1998 3-11-014870-6
Mirko Novák and Andreas Fuchs, Azatiwada, Awariku from the House of Mopsos, and Assyria. On the Dating of Karatepe in Cilicia, in: A. Payne, Š. Velharticka, J. Wintjes (ed.), Beyond all Boundaries. Anatolia in the 1st Millennium B.C. OBO (Leuven, 2020), pp. 23–91.
Cyrus H. Gordon, Phoenician Inscriptions from Karatepe, The Jewish Quarterly Review, New Series, vol. 39, no. 1, pp. 41–50, 1948
Julian. Obermann, New Discoveries at Karatepe. A Complete Text of the Phoenician Royal Inscription from Cilicia, Transactions of the Connecticut Academy of Arts and Sciences, Connecticut Academy of Arts and Sciences, vol. 38, 1948
Benno Landsberger, Sam'al, Studien zur Entdeckung der Ruinenstaette Karatepe, Druckerei der Türkischen Historischen Gesellschaft, 1948

External links

Alan Humm, Translation of Phoenician text into English: http://jewishchristianlit.com/Texts/ANEhist/karatepe.html

Archaeological sites in the Mediterranean Region, Turkey
Hittite sites in Turkey
Hittite cities
Luwian inscriptions
Quwê
Former populated places in Cilicia
Tourist attractions in Osmaniye Province
Kadirli District
World Heritage Tentative List for Turkey
Phoenician colonies in Turkey